Stefan Bajic may refer to: 

 Stefan Bajic (footballer, born 1997), Montenegrin footballer
 Stefan Bajic (footballer, born 2001), French footballer